Charles Martin (6 August 1836 – 28 March 1878) was an English first-class cricketer. Martin was a left-handed batsman who bowled left-arm roundarm fast.

Martin made his first-class debut for Hampshire against the Marylebone Cricket Club in 1869. Martin represented Hampshire in four first-class matches from 1869 to 1870. Martin's final appearance for the county came against Lancashire. Martin took nine wickets for Hampshire at a bowling average of 18.66, with best figures of 3/38.

As well as representing Hampshire, Martin also represented the left-handers in the Left-Handed v Right-Handed first-class fixture.

Martin died at Hilsea, Hampshire on 28 March 1878.

External links
Charles Martin at Cricinfo
Charles Martin at CricketArchive

1836 births
1878 deaths
People from New Forest District
English cricketers
Hampshire cricketers